Peter Curran is a broadcaster, writer, audio producer and documentary maker. He grew up in Belfast, the eldest of six children and worked on funfairs in the USA before moving to London, working as a site carpenter and office fitter for seven years, then re-training as a BBC reporter. In 1992 he began DJing full-time for the London radio station BBC GLR.
He presented BBC London's movie programme The Big Picture for three years and reviewed films for the magazine Sight and Sound.  

Curran co-founded audio publisher Talking Music in 2012, publishing books on Eminem, Jimi Hendrix, Acid house, The Coasters, The Beatles, Glam rock, Adele, The Clash and others, written and read by authors such as Charles Shaar Murray, Jane Bussmann and Barney Hoskyns. 

During 2017/18 he travelled across the USA for the Radio 4 series Litter From America which featured "the scuffed and stained American dreams" of actor Richard Schiff, comedian Maysoon Zayid and director Kwame Kwei-Armah as their creative work and beliefs grappled with the Trump presidency.

With co-host Patrick Marber, Curran created Bunk Bed (radio programme), a series of bizarre late-night conversations recorded in beds and in the dark, featuring music, archive speech and guests such as Cate Blanchett, Andi Oliver, and Kathy Burke. First broadcast in April 2014 on BBC Radio 4, Series 9 was aired in January 2022 with guest Harry Shearer. 

In 2018, he was commissioned by the Imperial War Museum to explore the role of Ireland's borderland communities in the First World War for The Art of Border Living, featuring his essays, BBC documentaries and commissioned short story podcasts from Irish authors. 

He has reported from South Africa, India and the USA for From Our Own Correspondent and in 2020 for Spirit of the Midnight Sun, explored the history of Sami reindeer herders and the effect of climate change on the Sami community at Varangerfjord. 

During 2022, Curran produced and directed the Radio 4 Christmas Drama Love Pants about the turbulent relationship between actor Jane Horrocks and the singer and songwriter Ian Dury featuring Dury's letters, Horrocks' diaries, and accompanying music by Mick Gallagher.

Career
His presenting career began in the 1990s when he hosted a weekday show on BBC GLR featuring live music sessions and interviews with artists such as Radiohead, The Staple Singers, Foo Fighters, Wu Tang Clan and Dr John alongside record reviews and profile interviews with authors, film makers and comedians. The Peter Curran Show ran for six years until 1999, when BBC London adopted a News/Phone-in format for the 4pm-6pm slot.  
He's an independent documentary maker and radio producer, Curran persuaded Nick Leeson and his former boss Peter Norris and colleagues to face each other for the first time since Leeson precipitated the collapse of Barings Bank, for a famously tense edition of The Reunion on BBC Radio 4. Curran created the online TV series The Teaching Challenge for Brook Lapping and directed five series of the show from 2007 to 2011.

In 1998, with producer Stephen Wilkinson, he began work on the first UK television programmes to feature streaming video and an interactive website. The shows featured news about internet developments, technology and culture. They were recorded in London's Cybercafe for broadcast on BBC2.

Curran has written and presented documentaries and shows for BBC Radio 4 and BBC Radio 2 including a year as presenter of Loose Ends, Pick of the Week and Spinal Tap: Back From the Dead, a faux-documentary which Curran produced with the original cast of the movie This Is Spinal Tap. He presented The Tribes of Science seres for Radio 4 and The Arts Show for Radio 2.  Other examples of his work include The Foghorn: A Celebration and The Electric Ride series for Radio 4 and BBC Online, for which he drove an electric car five thousand miles through seven European countries asking local people to recharge the battery every 100 miles.

For television, Curran has scripted and/or presented numerous Arts and culture programmes, such as Personal Passions, When Art Went Pop and Edinburgh Nights for BBC2. He presented Channel 4's Wired World, Discovery Channel's architecture and engineering series Building The Best, Restoration Nation and a 40-part Arts education series for BBC Knowledge Culture Fix.

His TV and radio journalism about Northern Ireland include the television essays Maiden City Voyage, billed as a social and cultural audit of Derry during its City of Culture role, Slack Sabbath, a wry TV journey into how religious observance has changed since 1970's, and for BBC Radio 4Collecting the Troubles At The Ulster Museum the series One To One and in 2022 The Past Is a Foreign Country

Curran wrote and presented Radio 4's documentary appreciation of John Hersey's 1946 Hiroshima article for The New Yorker magazine followed by a repeat of the harrowing 1948 BBC broadcast of the entire text, which had graphically described the true aftermath and effects of atomic bomb radiation for the first time. In 2020 he produced the radio documentary series The Hidden History of Place Names exploring the entwined history of Unionist and Nationalist communities in the north of Ireland across seven hundred years. It was broadcast in Irish and English and featured new research on language and locations from historians and linguists at Queen's University, Belfast. During 2021, after the UK Govt announcement of an end to sales of new petrol and diesel engines cars by 2030, Curran drove a range of electric cars throughout England, Scotland and Wales for the Radio 4 series Electric Ride UK. Scientists, technologists and manufacturers demonstrated latest developments in Green energy storage, and the series explored the potential social impact of a changing transport landscape.

References

Living people
British radio producers
Television personalities from Belfast
Television presenters from Northern Ireland
Male non-fiction writers from Northern Ireland
British radio presenters
Year of birth missing (living people)
21st-century writers from Northern Ireland
Writers from Belfast